Nicola Pasini (born 10 April 1991) is an Italian footballer who plays for LR Vicenza.

Biography
Born in Chiavenna, Lombardy, Pasini started his career at A.C. Milan. From 2008 to 2011 Pasini was a member of the reserve. On 20 July 2011 Pasini was exchanged with Matteo Chinellato in co-ownership in 3-year contract, (50% Chinellato €1.75M and Pasini €1.65M) and which Milan registered a capital gains of €3.3 million, however it was in terms of Chinellato's asset value of €3.5 million and vice versa (Genoa capital gains of €3.5M) . Furthermore, both clubs had to amortize the contract value (transfer fee) as the cost of hiring the player in installments, as well as VAT. He signed a 3-year contract.
On 27 July 2011 Pasini left for Carrarese in temporary deal. He made 17 starts and 1 substitute appearance, mainly as a centre-back. On 1 June 2012, Milan acquired Chinellato and Pelé outright; Genoa acquired Pasini and Mario Sampirisi outright in the same deal, all in pure player swap as Pelé's price was €50,000 less.

In July 2012 he joined Serie B club Spezia Calcio in another temporary deal. He was signed by Venezia on 2 August 2013. Circa 2013 he also signed a contract extension which last until 30 June 2015.

On 14 July 2014 he was signed by Pistoiese of the third division. On 30 January 2015 he was signed by Carpi.

In July 2016 he joined Serie C side Bassano in an undisclosed fee.

International career
Pasini played for Italy U17 team in 2008 UEFA European Under-17 Football Championship qualification (2 starts). He was the member of the squad for 2008 Minsk youth tournament. However no lineup was known. Pasini received call-up to Italy national under-18 football team in October 2008. However Pasini did not play any game for the U18 in 2008–09 season nor U19 in 2009–10 season. He received a call-up for a friendly match in October 2009. Pasini played once for the U20 team in 2010–11 Four Nations Tournament.

Honours
 Coppa Italia Primavera: 2010 (Milan U20)
 Campionato Nazionale Allievi: 2007 (Milan U17)

References

External links
 FIGC 
 Football.it Profile 

Italian footballers
A.C. Milan players
Genoa C.F.C. players
Carrarese Calcio players
Spezia Calcio players
Venezia F.C. players
U.S. Pistoiese 1921 players
A.C. Carpi players
Bassano Virtus 55 S.T. players
L.R. Vicenza players
Serie B players
Serie C players
Italy youth international footballers
Association football defenders
People from Chiavenna
1991 births
Living people
Footballers from Lombardy
Sportspeople from the Province of Sondrio